Block or blocked may refer to:

Arts, entertainment and media

Broadcasting
 Block programming, the result of a programming strategy in broadcasting
 W242BX, a radio station licensed to Greenville, South Carolina, United States known as 96.3 the Block 
 WFNZ-FM, a radio station licensed to Harrisburg, North Carolina, United States, branded as 92.7 The Block
 Blocked (The Flash), an episode of the television series The Flash

Music
 Block Entertainment, a record label
 Blocks Recording Club, a record label
 Woodblock (instrument), a small piece of slit drum made from one piece of wood and used as a percussion instrument
 "Blocks", by C418 from Minecraft - Volume Beta, 2013

Toys
 Toy block, one of a set of wooden or plastic pieces, of various shapes
 Unit block, a type of standardized wooden toy block for children

Video game
 Blocked (video game), a puzzle game for the iPhone and iPod Touch

Building and construction
 Breeze block, cinder block or cement block, a concrete masonry unit for building
 Compressed earth block, a building block or unit for construction
 Tower block, a high-rise building

Land subdivisions
 Block (district subdivision), administrative region in some South Asian countries
 Block (rural Australia), a small agricultural landholding
 City block, the smallest area that is surrounded by streets

Places

United States
 Block, Illinois, an unincorporated community
 Block, Kansas, an unincorporated community
 Block, Tennessee, an unincorporated community
 Block Island, an island in the state of Rhode Island

Science and technology
 Block (periodic table), a set of adjacent groups in the periodic table
 Block (meteorology), large-scale patterns in the atmospheric pressure field
 Fault block, a geologic zone or geologic province
 Block, Inc., an American technology company formerly known as Square

Computing
 Block (blockchain), a segment of an open list of data records
 Block (data storage), the practice of storing electronic data in equally sized units
 Block (Internet), technical measures to restrict users' access to certain internet resources
 Blocking access to certain websites is one form of internet censorship 
 Block (programming), a group of declarations and statements treated as a unit
 Block (telecommunications), a unit of data transmission
 Block artifact, a type of distortion in a compressed image
 Block-level element, in the HTML markup language
 Blocks (C language extension), an extension to the C programming language designed to support parallel programming
 Unicode block, a named range of codepoints in Unicode
 Block Elements, a Unicode block of block-shaped characters

Engineering
 Engine block and cylinder block, the main part of an internal combustion engine
 Block (sailing), a single or multiple pulley used on sailboats

Medicine
 Nerve block, or regional nerve blockade, any deliberate interruption of signals traveling along a nerve, often for the purpose of pain relief
 Local anesthetic nerve block (sometimes referred to as simply "nerve block"), a short-term block
 Nerve block, the deliberate temporary degeneration of nerve fibers to produce a block that may persist for weeks, months, or indefinitely
 Neurectomy, the cutting through or removal of a nerve or a section of a nerve, which usually produces a permanent block
 Third-degree atrioventricular block (AV block), a medical condition

Mathematics
 Block (permutation group theory)
 Block, in modular representation theory
 Block, in graph theory, is a  biconnected component, a maximal biconnected subgraph of a graph
 Aschbacher block of a finite group
 Block design, a kind of set system in combinatorial mathematics
 Block matrix
 Block of a ring, a centrally primitive idempotent or the ideal it generates

Sports
 Block, a defensive shot in pickleball
 Block (basketball), when a defensive player legally deflects a shot
 Blocking (martial arts)
 Starting blocks, devices used by sprinters to assist in preventing their feet from slipping as they break into a run
 Block (cricket), when a batsman deflects the ball to avoid getting out
 The Block (basketball), a defensive play in game 7 of the 2016 NBA Finals

Transportation
 Block number, a system to differentiate between groups of aircraft of the same type with minor variants
 Signalling block system, a way of controlling train movement

People

 Block (musician) (Jamie Block), an anti-folk musician based in New York, US

Other uses
 Block letters (also known as printscript, manuscript, print writing, or ball and stick in academics), a sans-serif (or "Gothic") style of writing
 Block party (also known as street party), a community social event
 Block scheduling, a type of academic scheduling
 Hat block, or block shaper, a wooden block carved into the shape of a hat by a craftsman
 Postage stamp block, an attached group of postage stamps

See also
 
 
 
 Block House (disambiguation)
 Block Party (disambiguation)
 The Block (disambiguation)
 Blockbuster (disambiguation)
 Blockhead (disambiguation)
 Bloc (disambiguation)
 Blockade (disambiguation)
 Blockbuster (disambiguation)
 Blocker (disambiguation)
 Blocking (disambiguation)